Badriyya al-Shihhi (born 1971) is an Omani novelist, the first Omani woman writer to publish a novel. In the judgment of the Egyptian poet and journalist Ashraf Dali, al-Shihhi's 1999 novel "realized the birth of the real Omani novel".

Works
 Al-Tawaf haythu al-jamr [Treading Around the Embers]. Beirut: Al-Mu'assasa al-'Arabiyya lil-Dira wa-l-Nashr, 1999.

References

Sources
 Barbara Michalak-Pikulska, "Modern Poetry and Prose of Oman 1970-2000", Krakow: The Enigma Press 2002

1971 births
Living people
Omani novelists
Omani women writers